In 1832, the city of Memphis, Tennessee deeded the church a site at the corner of Poplar Avenue and Third Street (now called B.B. King). The present building  was built in 1884 and was designed by architect Edward Culliatt Jones and is listed on the National Register of Historic Places.

See also
 National Register of Historic Places listings in Shelby County, Tennessee

References

Churches on the National Register of Historic Places in Tennessee
Romanesque Revival church buildings in Tennessee
Churches in Memphis, Tennessee
National Register of Historic Places in Memphis, Tennessee